The 2006–07 Mestis season was the seventh season of the Mestis, the second level of ice hockey in Finland. 12 teams participated in the league, and Hokki won the championship.

Standings

Playoffs

Mestis Qualification
The bottom four themes and the losers from the quarter finals faced each other in the relegation playouts. Each stage consisted of best-of-5 series with the loser moving to the next round. The two losers from relegation round 2 faced the best 2 teams from Suomi-sarja.

SM-Liiga Qualification

External links
 Season on hockeyarchives.info

Fin
2006–07 in Finnish ice hockey
Mestis seasons